Hybomitra californica is a species of horse flies in the family Tabanidae.

Distribution
Canada, United States

References

Tabanidae
Insects described in 1882
Diptera of North America